Miltiadis Goulimis (1844–1896) was a Greek politician from Missolonghi. In the Greek elections on April 16, 1895, he defeated the former Prime Minister Charilaos Trikoupis and won the regional seat, leaving Trikoupis out of the Hellenic Parliament.

External links

1844 births
1896 deaths
Greek MPs 1895–1899

People from Missolonghi